K10OI was a low-power television station in Marina, California, broadcasting locally on channel 5 as an affiliate of Tele Vida Abundante. Founded April 5, 1996, the station was owned by J B Broadcasting.

The station originally broadcast on channel 10 until August 14, 2001, when it was forced to cease operations to accommodate for KSBW's digital channel. It has since broadcast on channel 5 via special temporary authority by the FCC.

References

10OI
Television channels and stations established in 1996